

Ælfwold (or Ælfweald or Aelfwold) was a medieval Bishop of Crediton.

Life
Ælfwold was a Benedictine monk at Glastonbury Abbey before he was elected to Crediton between 986 and 987. He was succeeded by Ælfwold III in 1008. He died between sometime before a time frame between 1011 and 1015.

Will
Ælfwold's will is still extant, and the hand drawing up the will matches the hand that drew up a charter of 997 from King Æthelred II to Ælfwold.

In his will, Ælfwold freed all the slaves that had worked on his estates, suggesting the existence of slavery in Anglo-Saxon England, was tempered by the need to free such slaves on death.

Citations

References

External links
 

Bishops of Crediton (ancient)
10th-century English bishops
11th-century English Roman Catholic bishops
1010s deaths
English Christian monks
Benedictine bishops
English Benedictines
Year of birth unknown
Year of death uncertain